The Society I Live in Is Mine is a 1963 book by Paul Goodman of his accumulated letters to the editor and other public commentary ephemera.

Publication 

Horizon Press published the book in hardcover on April 4, 1963.

References

Bibliography 

 
 
  Also published in

External links 

 

1963 non-fiction books
English-language books